Sarla Grewal (4 October 1927 – 29 January 2002) was the second female Indian Administrative Service officer in India, when she joined IAS in 1952. She was the Governor of Madhya Pradesh (1989–1990). She was the principal secretary for Rajiv Gandhi.

In addition to the above-mentioned posts, she held Shimla's first deputy commissioner, Secretary to Prime Minister at WHO and UNICEF.

Career
Born in a Jat Sikh family, Grewal did her bachelor's from Hans Raj Mahila Maha Vidyalaya. After graduating, she joined IAS in 1952. Then in 1956, she was the Deputy Commissioner and was the first woman in India to be appointed to the post nationwide. She was awarded the British Council Scholarship at LSE on social services in developing countries, with special emphasis on health, education and society welfare schemes.

In 1963, she became the health secretary in Punjab and during her tenure Punjab received four awards for national family welfare. In 1985 Grewal was appointed PM's secretary.

Later in her life she became the chairman of Tribune Trust which she continued until her death.

Death
Grewal died of pulmonary tuberculosis and chronic kidney failure on January 29, 2002.

See also
 List of Governors of Madhya Pradesh

References 

Governors of Madhya Pradesh
Indian Administrative Service officers
1927 births
2002 deaths
Rajiv Gandhi administration
Cabinet Secretaries of India
Women state governors of India